Bose Alao Omotoyossi (born 6 January 1985) is a Nigerian Nollywood actress and producer.

Early life
Bose was born in Lagos in a family of 5, as the 4th child. She came to prominence after her performance in a Yoruba Nollywood movie titled Itakun.

Bose completed her primary school education at Command Children School and attended Gideon Comprehensive High School graduating in 2002. Her tertiary education was at University of Lagos - where she was due to study biology (differed her admission after she conceived shortly after her introduction, due to multiple births, she was unable to go back). She attended Lagos City Polytechnic Ikeja where she obtained a National Diploma in Business Administration.

Career
Bose is a Professional Nollywood actor, Filmmaker, Endorsement Model, and Entrepreneur.

Personal life
Bose is married to Razak Omotoyossi a Nigerian-born Beninese footballer and is the mother of 4 girls.

Production
Imoran Ika(2006)
Opa Abo(2007)
Olasubomi(2011)
Bomilashiri(2013)
Rivers Between(2014)
Rough Day(2016)
Blindspots(2016)

Awards
Zafaa Awards United Kingdom 2011(Best  Actress)

Filmography

See also
Ini Edo
Funke Akindele
Juliet Ibrahim
Emem Isong
Omotola Jalade Ekeinde
Dakore Akande

See also
 List of Nigerian film producers

References 

 Nollywood actress Bose Alao Omotoyosi releases lovely new photos, retrieved 12 October 2016
 Nollywood Actress Bose Alao Welcomes 4th Baby, retrieved 12 October 2016
 Actress and wife of footballer, Bose Alao Omotoyossi bags first endorsement deal, retrieved 12 October 2016
 My Husband Paid Millions For My Telephone Number- Bose Alao, retrieved 12 October 2016

1985 births
Nigerian film actresses
20th-century Nigerian actresses
Living people
Nigerian film producers
21st-century Nigerian actresses
Yoruba actresses
Actresses in Yoruba cinema
Actresses from Lagos
Nigerian film award winners